Zhaohua District is a district of the city of Guangyuan, Sichuan Province, China. It was formerly called Yuanba District.

Districts of Sichuan
Guangyuan